A stripper, or tube stripper, is a medical tool used for removing air or liquid from rubber tubes, such as those used for infusion.  They can also be used for connecting the bags used by blood banks for the blood collection process. Its design is similar to a pair of pliers, but the jaws do not quite close (providing space enough for a flattened, empty tube) and have cylinders that can be rolled along the tube similar to the mechanism of a peristaltic pump. A stripper may be used, for instance, to move blood that remains in the tube at the end of a blood collection into the bag, thus avoiding wastage.

Medical equipment